Torredelcampo is a city located in the province of Jaén, Spain.  The village is located 11 km northwest of Jaén, bordering the highway A-316, at 640 meters above sea level . According to the 2006 census (INE), the city has a population of 14,076 inhabitants.

References

Municipalities in the Province of Jaén (Spain)